Going! Going! Gosh! is a 1952 Warner Bros. Merrie Melodies cartoon directed by Chuck Jones. The short was released on August 23, 1952, and stars Wile E. Coyote and the Road Runner.

Plot
Wile E. Coyote (with the mock genus/species name in faux-Latin Carnivorous Vulgaris) attempts to catch the Road Runner (Acceleratii Incredibus). He appears on the road after being hidden in a cavern, ready to strike the bird with his fork and knife, but Road Runner quickly moves underneath him and Coyote gets his own body tangled up. When untangled, he runs after his prey,  but when getting near, he discovers Road Runner can travel even faster and he propels himself far away from the Coyote who is left behind astounded by this pace. Wile E. Coyote thinks hard, and tries using several methods:

1. As the Road Runner speeds at 130 mph across the mountain roads, the coyote fires a bow loaded with some dynamite attached to an arrow. However, it is just like that — he fires the bow, and the dynamite explodes on himself. The middle portion of the arrow falls off.

2. The fuming Coyote loads himself onto a slingshot; however, the support breaks out of the ground and wedges him into a cactus.

3. Wile E. Coyote now tries covering the ground with quick-drying cement to stop the Road Runner. Unfortunately, the Road Runner cuts directly through it without being touched, and the Coyote is covered all over. Enraged, Wile E. attempts to follow, but the cement dries, leaving him frozen stiff like a statue.

4. Hoping to avoid being hit with loose ends, Wile hides himself under a manhole with an armed hand grenade, but the Road Runner passes through the road fast enough to drop a boulder on top of the cover, which prevents the Coyote from throwing the grenade out at the bird before it explodes. Dazed, Wile peeks out to inspect the cause, and the manhole cover, and then the boulder, land on his head.

5. Wile E. Coyote dresses as an attractive, blond hitch hiker holding a sign that says "Ole Virginy or Bust" in an attempt to lure the Road Runner, but the clever bird speeds right past him and uncovers the Coyote. The Road Runner returns with Wile E's wig, holding up a sign saying "I've Already Got a Date".

6. Using deception, the Coyote paints a realistic picture of a bridge and places it at the dead-end of a high-level road as displayed by a sign that the Coyote turns around to make the facade convincing. The Road Runner runs through the trick picture as if it was a real road. As the Coyote looks on, puzzled, he fails to see a truck emerging through the road in the painting, which promptly runs him over. Frustrated, the Coyote starts after Road Runner but tears through the painting and falls into the chasm, leaving dust in the air that spells out "Oh, no!"

7. Wile heaves a large boulder onto the winding mountain roads which the Road Runner is traveling. Eventually, the Road Runner and the boulder approach the same area, but the Road Runner slips just out of the way, while the boulder is pitched into the air, up a serac, and onto a new set of roads. The Coyote is out peeking at the roads, hoping to see the Road Runner crushed, but instead he is about to suffer the same fate. The boulder is approaching from behind, and Wile E. sees it coming but cannot escape fast enough (this gag is set to Wagner's "Rienzi" Overture).

8. The Coyote, hoping for technology to triumph, uses various ACME devices put together (an anvil, a weather balloon, a street cleaner's bin, and a fan) to create a makeshift air balloon. Floating in the clouds, he sees the Road Runner and releases the anvil, causing the balloon to quickly ascend until it stops. At this point, the string keeping it blown up unfurls, sending it flying through the air until it runs out of air.  Coyote falls through the ground (passing the deflated balloon and the anvil), followed by the anvil falling on his head and the Road Runner passing over him just to embarrass him even further.

9. The Coyote, listening out for the Road Runner's beeping, drops from a high log and lunges towards the bird with a javelin, only to realise that the beeping came from a nearby truck, which the Coyote dives straight into, and is thus whacked into the air and wound around the log. The camera cuts to the truck to show that the Road Runner is driving.

Additional Crew
 Production Manager: John W. Burton
 Film Edited by Treg Brown
 Orchestration by Milt Franklyn
 Uncredited Animation by Abe Levitow and Richard Thompson

Home media
Going! Going! Gosh! is available on the Looney Tunes Golden Collection: Volume 2 DVD.

See also
 Looney Tunes and Merrie Melodies filmography (1950–1959)

References

External links
 

1952 animated films
1952 short films
Merrie Melodies short films
Warner Bros. Cartoons animated short films
American animated short films
Short films directed by Chuck Jones
Wile E. Coyote and the Road Runner films
Films scored by Carl Stalling
1950s Warner Bros. animated short films
Animated films without speech
Films with screenplays by Michael Maltese
Films about Canis
Animated films about birds
Animated films about mammals
Films produced by Edward Selzer
Films scored by Milt Franklyn